Milton Owen Ingley (May 23, 1946 – December 22, 2006), also known as Michael Morrison, was an American pornographic actor, producer, and director.
He was a member the AVN Hall of Fame and the XRCO Hall of Fame.

Biography
Ingley was born in Lubbock, Texas, and attended Texas Tech University there.
He was a corporal in the U.S. Army and served in Vietnam from 1967 to 1968.

Ingley entered the adult film industry in 1977, appearing in a film as a favor to a girlfriend.

Ingley performed in over 140 films during the 1970s and 1980s under various names including Michael Morrison.
He also produced and directed over 100 films with his own production company Chandler Studios during the 1980s and 1990s.

Ingley, as Morrison, was inducted into the X-Rated Critics Organization Hall of Fame in 1993 as a "Film Pioneer".

In 1997, Ingley obtained a copy of an intimate video tape stolen from the home of Tommy and Pamela Anderson Lee and sold copies from the web site www.pamlee.com.  The Lees sued Ingley and obtained a court injunction ordering him to stop selling the video.

Ingley lived in Amsterdam from 1997 to 2004. He moved to Texas and then Arizona to be closer to his family, according to his friend Sharon Mitchell.
Milton Ingley died at his home in Mesa, Arizona on December 22, 2006 from complications of diabetes. He is buried at the National Memorial Cemetery of Arizona in Phoenix.

Partial filmography
Island of Dr. Love (1978)
Coed Fever (1980)
Taboo (1980)

References

McNeil, Legs; Jennifer Osborne (2005). The Other Hollywood: The Uncensored Oral History of the Porn Film Industry. HarperCollins, pp. 568–571. .

External links
 
 
 
  findagrave.com

1946 births
2006 deaths
American male pornographic film actors
People from Lubbock, Texas
American pornographic film directors
American pornographic film producers
United States Army personnel of the Vietnam War
American expatriates in the Netherlands
Texas Tech University alumni
Film directors from Texas
United States Army soldiers
20th-century American male actors